Collinsella tanakaei  is a Gram-positive, strictly anaerobic, non-spore-forming and rod-shaped bacterium from the genus of Collinsella which has been isolated from human faeces from Tokyo in Japan.

References

 

Coriobacteriaceae
Bacteria described in 2010